Misonne's soft-furred mouse or Misonne's praomys (Praomys misonnei) is a species of rodent in the family Muridae.
It is found in Democratic Republic of the Congo, Kenya, and Uganda.
Its natural habitats are subtropical or tropical moist lowland forest, subtropical or tropical moist montane forest, and arable land.

References

Praomys
Mammals described in 1987
Taxonomy articles created by Polbot